The year 2005 is the 4th year in the history of the Cage Rage Championships, a mixed martial arts promotion based in the United Kingdom. In 2005 Cage Rage Championships held 5 events, Cage Rage 10.

Title fights

Events list

Cage Rage 10

Cage Rage 10 was an event held on February 26, 2005 at The Wembley Conference Centre in London, United Kingdom.

Results

Cage Rage 11

Cage Rage 11 was an event held on April 30, 2005 at The Wembley Conference Centre in London, United Kingdom.

Results

Cage Rage 12

Cage Rage 12 was an event held on July 2, 2005 at The Wembley Conference Centre in London, United Kingdom.

Results

Cage Rage 13

Cage Rage 13 was an event held on September 10, 2005 at The Wembley Conference Centre in London, United Kingdom.

Results

Cage Rage 14

Cage Rage 14 was an event held on December 3, 2005 at The Wembley Conference Centre in London, United Kingdom.

Results

See also 
 Cage Rage Championships
 List of Cage Rage champions
 List of Cage Rage events

References

Cage Rage Championships events
2005 in mixed martial arts